Salisbury City F.C. was an English football club based in Salisbury, unrelated to the later Salisbury City F.C. and the current Salisbury F.C.

The club joined the Western Football League in 1905–06, having previously played in the Hampshire League. The following season they moved up to the Southern League, where they stayed until 1911.

The club resurfaced in the Western League in 1927, left again in 1929, and rejoined in 1930. They remained in Division Two of the Western League throughout the 1930s, finishing as runners-up three times, and left the league for the final time in 1939. The club folded during the Second World War, and a new club named Salisbury was formed in 1947.

City were also regular entrants in the FA Cup, reaching the Fourth Qualifying Round twice in 1928–29 and 1931–32.

League history
Salisbury City's seasons of Western and Southern League football are listed below.

References

Defunct football clubs in England
Western Football League
Southern Football League clubs
Football clubs in Salisbury
Defunct football clubs in Wiltshire
Association football clubs disestablished in the 1940s